Aleksandrs Jelisejevs (born 11 August 1971) is a Latvian football coach and a former international striker. He is the manager of the Latvia national under-16 team. He obtained a total number of 37 caps for the Latvia national football team, scoring four goals. He also played in Finland, Hungary, Russia and Israel during his career.

Honours
National Team
 Baltic Cup
 1993

Skonto FC
 Latvian Champion (1):
1992
 Virsliga Top Scorer (1):
1993
 Best Forward in the Latvian League (1):
1993

References

External links 
 

1971 births
Sportspeople from Daugavpils
Living people
Latvian footballers
Association football forwards
Skonto FC players
Hapoel Beit She'an F.C. players
FC Metallurg Lipetsk players
FC Elista players
FC Torpedo NN Nizhny Novgorod players
FC Arsenal Tula players
Chengdu Tiancheng F.C. players
FC Hämeenlinna players
JFK Olimps players
Strømsgodset Toppfotball players
Latvian Higher League players
Liga Leumit players
Russian First League players
Russian Premier League players
China League One players
Veikkausliiga players
Norwegian First Division players
Norwegian Third Division players
Latvia international footballers
Latvian expatriate footballers
Expatriate footballers in Israel
Expatriate footballers in Hungary
Expatriate footballers in Russia
Expatriate footballers in China
Expatriate footballers in Finland
Expatriate footballers in Norway
Latvian expatriate sportspeople in Israel
Latvian expatriate sportspeople in Hungary
Latvian expatriate sportspeople in Russia
Latvian expatriate sportspeople in China
Latvian expatriate sportspeople in Finland
Latvian expatriate sportspeople in Norway
Latvian football managers